Events in the year 1994 in Eritrea.

Incumbents 

 President: Isaias Afewerki

Events 

 February – The People's Front for Democracy and Justice (PFDJ) was founded.

Deaths

References 

 
1990s in Eritrea
Years of the 20th century in Eritrea
Eritrea
Eritrea